Edoardo Catellani (24 July 1922 – 10 July 2019) was an Italian politician who served in the Senate from 1968 to 1979, representing the Unified Socialist Party and the Italian Socialist Party. He died in 2019 from a heart problem.

References

1922 births
2019 deaths
Italian Socialist Party politicians
Senators of Legislature V of Italy
Senators of Legislature VI of Italy
Senators of Legislature VII of Italy
People from Sondrio
Members of the Italian Senate from Lombardy